Muhammad Ashraf Ali was an Awami League politician and the former Member of Parliament of Sylhet-6. He was a former president of Sylhet District Awami League and part of the last District Awami League Advisory Council.

Early life
Ali was born into a Bengali Muslim family in Balaganj Thana, Sylhet District, British Raj (now Osmani Nagar Upazila, Sylhet District, Bangladesh).

Career
In 1968, Ali became the elected president of the Sylhet District branch of the Chhatra League. During the Bangladesh Liberation War of 1971, he was a local freedom organiser. Ali was also a president of the Greater Sylhet Ganadabi Parishad.

Ali was elected to parliament from Sylhet-6 (now known as Sylhet-2) as an BAKSAL candidate in 1975 in a by-election. The constituency covered Bishwanath Thana and Balaganj Thana.

Death
He died in a private hospital in Sylhet on 22 January 2015. His body was honoured by the government in Sylhet Central Shahid Minar and then taken to Osmani Nagar and Shah Jalal Dargah where two janazas were performed, and he was buried in the latter's adjacent graveyard.

References

Awami League politicians
2015 deaths
1st Jatiya Sangsad members
People from Osmani Nagar Upazila